The G A Towton Cup is a Perth Racing Listed race Thoroughbred horse race held under quality handicap conditions, for horses aged three years old and upwards, over a distance of 2200 metres at Ascot Racecourse, Perth, Western Australia in December.  Prize money is A$100,000.

History
The race is a major preparatory race for the Perth Cup which is held on New Year's Day.

In 2003 the race was run at Belmont Park Racecourse.

Name
In 2004 the race was run under the name JRA (Japan Racing Association) Trophy.
In 2014 the race was run under the name of the Queens Cup.

Grade
1983–2013 - Listed race
2014 - Group 3
2015 - Listed race

Distance
1983–1984 – 2200 metres
1984–2001 – 2400 metres
2002–2003 – 2200 metres
2004–2013 – 2400 metres
2014 onwards - 2200 metres

Winners

2019 - Taxagano
2018 - Cappo D'Oro
2017 - Trap For Fools
2016 - Kia Ora Koutou
2015 - Dust Me Off
2014 - Real Love
2013 - Knightlike
2012 - Global Flirt
2011 - race not held
2010 - Brandy Lane 
2009 - race not held
2008 - Exhilarating 
2007 - Luskin Dancer
2006 - Ramiro 
2005 - Miss Copycat 
2004 - Reigning Fort
2003 - Celtus 
2002 - So Canny 
2001 - Cardinal Colours 
2000 - Noble Cavalier 
1999 - Kim Angel  
1998 - Master Touch 
1997 - Big Cloud 
1996 - Maestro's Mischief 
1995 - True Russian 
1994 - Big Al 
1993 - Sir Vole 
1992 - Red Javelin 
1991 - Red Javelin 
1990 - All Spark 
1989 - William's Ghost 
1988 - Betoota 
1987 - Linc The Leopard 
1986 - Nippie's Dream 
1985 - Ullyatt 
1984 - Swift Knight  
1983 - Rosamoss

See also
 List of Australian Group races
 Group races

References

Horse races in Australia
Sport in Perth, Western Australia